Brian K. Blount (born in Smithfield, Virginia) is a Presbyterian minister, New Testament scholar and current President of Union Presbyterian Seminary. He is a preacher and scholar on the Book of Revelation.

Education
He holds a B.A. from the College of William and Mary, his M. Div from Princeton Theological Seminary, and a Ph.D. from Emory University.

Ministry career
He served as pastor of Carver Memorial Presbyterian Church in Newport News, Virginia, from 1982 to 1988, before studying for his doctorate. He served as the Richard J. Dearborne Professor of New Testament Interpretation at Princeton Theological Seminary for 15 years before being called as President of Union Presbyterian Seminary in Richmond, Virginia in 2007.

Other publications 
Blount is a contributor to The Christian Century.

Written Works 

Invasion of the Dead: Preaching Resurrection, Westminster John Knox Press, 2014
Revelation, Westminster John Knox Press, 2009
The New Interpreter’s Dictionary of the Bible, associate editor, Abingdon Press, 2007
True to Our Native Land: An African American New Testament Commentary, general editor, Fortress Press, 2007
Can I Get A Witness? Reading Revelation Through African-American Culture, Westminster John Knox Press, 2005
Preaching Mark in Two Voices, with Gary Charles, Westminster John Knox Press, 2002
Struggling with Scripture, with Walter Brueggemann and William Placher, Westminster John Knox Press, 2002
Then The Whisper Put On Flesh: New Testament Ethics in An African American Context, Abingdon Press, 2001
Making Room At The Table: An Invitation to Multicultural Worship, edited with Lenora Tubbs Tisdale, Westminster John Knox Press, 2000
Go Preach! Mark’s Kingdom Message and The Black Church Today, Orbis Press, 1998
Cultural Interpretation: Reorienting New Testament Criticism, Fortress Press, 1995

Sources
Brian Blount, Biographical Information, Union Theological Seminary & Presbyterian School of Christian Education, 2009

References

American Presbyterians
Union Presbyterian Seminary faculty
Living people
People from Smithfield, Virginia
Year of birth missing (living people)
African-American biblical scholars
College of William & Mary alumni
Princeton Theological Seminary alumni
 Emory University alumni